Lauren Marie Brant Hall (born 24 February 1989<ref>Birth date reference: 
 Birthdate based on News.com.au article. {{cite news|last1=Moran|first1=Jonathon|title=I'm a Celebrity Australia'''s Lauren Brant says she has lost her breasts|url=http://www.news.com.au/entertainment/tv/reality-tv/im-a-celebrity-australias-lauren-brant-says-she-has-lost-her-breasts/news-story/836e300cfce43ef5a33156e358524291|access-date=13 August 2016|work=News.com.au|date=24 February 2015| quote=Brant, who has her 26th birthday today...}}</ref>) is a South African-Australian television personality, singer, dancer and actress. Brant is a former member of the Australian children's musical group Hi-5.

Early life
Brant was born in South Africa. She moved with her family to Australia's Gold Coast shortly after birth. She began singing, dancing, acting and modelling at the age of three.

Career
Brant began her career as an actress with various roles in Australian television. In 2007, Brant appeared on H2O: Just Add Water. She also featured on The Strip, Mortified, The Starter Wife and Are We There Yet? She also featured in various theatre productions and the travelling Humphrey Bear show in 2007.

Brant joined the Australian children's musical group Hi-5 in 2009 along with Fely Irvine and Tim Maddren, the trio joining Stevie Nicholson and Casey Burgess, forming the line-up known as the "second generation" of the group. Brant remained with Hi-5 for five and a half years, until her final performances with the group in July 2014 on an Australian tour, in which the cast wore costumes she designed under her new fashion label, Loliboli. She was replaced by Tanika Anderson. Brant stated she had "the most amazing journey".

Brant appeared as a contestant in the Australian reality series I'm a Celebrity...Get Me Out of Here! in January 2015. She was eliminated from the competition in February, becoming the fourth contestant to be eliminated. Brant became known for "speaking her mind" and spoke of the intensity of the competition upon elimination.

In March 2015, Brant was announced as part of the cast of Bonnie Lythgoe's pantomime production of Aladdin and His Wondrous Lamp, playing Princess Yasmina. The stage production ran during July in Sydney.

Philanthropy

Brant is an ambassador for the McGrath Foundation.

Personal life
Brant has an interest in fitness.

Brant moved back to the Gold Coast in 2014 after spending six years living in Sydney as part of her role in Hi-5.

In September 2015, Woman's Day reported that Brant had allegedly had an affair with ex-NRL player Beau Ryan while they were working on the stage production of Aladdin and His Wondrous Lamp in July. Her then fiancé, Warren Riley, had discovered an exchange of text messages between the pair.

Brant met former Australian rules footballer Barry Hall while filming I'm a Celebrity...Get Me Out of Here!'' in South Africa in 2015. The pair confirmed they were dating in November 2016. In May 2017 Brant and her partner Hall announced the birth of their baby boy, Miller Hall. The two secretly got married on February 17, 2021 (a week before Brant's birthday). The pair have since had two more sons: Houston (born May 2019) and Samson (born October 2021).

Filmography

References

1989 births
Living people
21st-century Australian actresses
Australian female dancers
Australian pop singers
South African emigrants to Australia
White South African people
Australian people of Scottish descent
Musicians from Gold Coast, Queensland
21st-century Australian singers
I'm a Celebrity...Get Me Out of Here! (Australian TV series) participants
Australian children's musicians